Sven Ove Hedlund (1 March 1945 – 3 December 2022) was a Swedish pop singer who was a member of the music group Idolerna.

Hedlund sang in the Swedish bands Clifftones and Hep Stars in the 1960s. In 1968, the singer Charlotte Walker (born 1944) became a member of the band, and they formed the duo Svenne and Lotta (called "Sven and Charlotte" in several countries) the following year. The couple were married from 1969 until they divorced in 2014.

Hedlund died in Värnamo on 3 December 2022, at the age of 77.

References

External links

 
 

1945 births
2022 deaths
20th-century Swedish male singers
People from Solna Municipality
Swedish male singers
Swedish pop singers
Melodifestivalen contestants of 2000